Norah Head, originally known as Bungaree Noragh Point, is a headland and a coastal village in Central Coast Council on the Central Coast of New South Wales, Australia. Norah Head is known for its great surfing and clear beaches like Soldiers Beach near Wyrrabalong National Park and Pebbly Beach with Norah Head Rock Pool. The town is home to Norah Head Lighthouse with scenic views along the coast.

Lighthouse

The Norah Head Lighthouse was the last significant lighthouse built in New South Wales, a  tower, completed in 1903 with monetary assistance from the Hargraves family of Noraville after considerable numbers of ships foundered on the coast near the headland. Originally it was powered by a kerosene concentric wick lamp and still today it features a second order bivalve Fresnel lens prism floating on a mercury bath. At first, the prism was rotated by descending weights, but the light was electrified in 1961 and fully automated in 1995. Norah Head Lighthouse is considered to be a popular venue for weddings.

The former lighthouse keepers cottage (Head Keeper's separate cottage and two assistants semi-detached quarters) are maintained, and two of these are available for rent.

Heritage listings
Norah Head has a number of heritage-listed sites, including:
 Bush Street: Norah Head Lightstation Precinct

World War II

Geology
There are several unique landforms around the head. Immediately in front of the head there is a rock platform which was formed in the Permian to Triassic periods around 180 - 280 million years ago. In the platform there is a volcanic intrusion, a channel of darker rock running from one side of the platform to the other. The intrusion was created by waves quarrying a softer basalt lava flow out of the surrounding granite. The lava came from an ancient volcano, probably Mount Warrawolong to the west.

Climate

Gallery

References

 
Australian Merchant Navy
Suburbs of the Central Coast (New South Wales)
Headlands of New South Wales